The Kayanic or Kayan–Murik languages are a group of Austronesian languages spoken in Borneo by the Kayan, Morek Baram, Bahau, and related peoples.

Languages
The Kayanic languages are:

Kayan proper: Bahau, various languages called Kayan
Modang: Modang, Segai (Punan Kelai)
Müller-Schwaner "Punan": Hovongan, Aoheng, (Punan) Aput, Punan Merah, Kereho-Uheng
Murik

Robert Blust (1991) specifically excluded Kayan from his North Bornean languages.  He removed Bukat from Kayan in 2010.

Müller-Schwaner Punan languages are classified by Smith (2017) as Central Sarawak.

Smith (2017, 2019)
Smith (2017, 2019) classifies the Kayanic languages as follows:
Kayan–Murik
Kayan (Baram, Rejang-Busang, Bahau, Data Dian)
Murik–Merap (Ngorek, Pua’, Huang Bau, Merap)
Segai–Modang
Segai (Gaai, (Punan) Kelai)
Modang (Kelinjau Modang, Wahau Modang, Long Gelat)

West Kalimantan groups

Some Kayanic-speaking Dayak ethnic subgroups and their respective languages in West Kalimantan province, Indonesia:

{| class="wikitable"
! Group !! Language !! Regency
|-
| Buket || Buket || Kapuas Hulu
|-
| Kayaan || Kayaan || Kapuas Hulu
|-
| Punan || Punan || Kapuas Hulu
|}

References

External links 

 Kaipuleohone archived materials of Kayan from the Robert Blust collection (RB2-003-A, RB2-003-C).

 
Greater North Borneo languages